The Party Spirit is a 1954 British comedy play by Peter Jones and John Jowett.

It premiered at the Grand Theatre, Blackpool before transferring to the Piccadilly Theatre in London's West End where it ran for 131 performances between 23 September 1954 and 15 January 1955. Starring Robertson Hare and Ralph Lynn, the cast also included Roger Maxwell, Frank Thornton and Vera Pearce.

References

Bibliography
 Wearing, J.P. The London Stage 1950-1959: A Calendar of Productions, Performers, and Personnel.  Rowman & Littlefield, 2014.

1954 plays
British plays
West End plays
Comedy plays
Plays set in London